This is a list of schools in Dunfermline, Fife, Scotland.

Primary schools 
Dunfermline has 14 primary schools:
Bellyeoman Primary School
Canmore Primary School
Carnegie Primary School
Commercial Primary School
Duloch Primary School
Lynburn Primary School
Masterton Primary School
McLean Primary School
Milesmark Primary School
Pitreavie Primary School
Pittencrieff Primary School
St. Leonard's Primary School
St. Margaret's RC Primary School
Touch Primary School
Townhill Primary School

Secondary schools 
There are four high schools in Dunfermline:

Dunfermline High School, one of the oldest and most populated high schools in Scotland, founded in 1120.
Queen Anne High School, a large non-denominational secondary school of around 1,800. It is the fifth-largest in Scotland and serves pupils in the north of Dunfermline.
Woodmill High School
St. Columba's R.C. High School, one of only two Roman Catholic schools in Fife, serving West Fife. It has an expansive catchment area, stretching from Ballingry in the north to North Queensferry in the south, and Kincardine in the west to Lochgelly in the east.

Special schools
Calaiswood School, located in the Duloch Schools Campus, next to Duloch Primary, and part of Duloch Schools, is a purpose-built special school offering an elaborated curriculum for pupils with additional support needs from nursery age to 18. Calaiswood replaces the former Robert Henryson and Headwell schools. There is also a Department of Special Education at Woodmill High School.

Further education
Fife College (formerly Carnegie College and Lauder College), located in the Halbeath area to the east of the town.

References

Dunfermline
Dunfermline
Buildings and structures in Dunfermline